Al-Kuliya Al-Askariya, known up until 1958 as Al-Kuliya Al-Askariya Al-Malakiya, was an Iraqi football team founded in 1937 in Baghdad. They were the runners-up of Iraq's first ever national cup when they lost the final of the 1948–49 Iraq FA Cup to Sharikat Naft Al-Basra. They were also the first ever winners of the Iraq Central FA League, a regional league for teams from Baghdad and its neighbouring cities, when they earned the title in 1948–49. Their final season in the top-flight was 1969–70 when they were relegated to the region's second-tier.

Al-Kuliya Al-Askariya were consigned to competing in non-IFA competitions after 1974 following the introduction of a clubs-only league system in Iraq, and competed in Army competitions until 1991 when the team was disbanded along with several other Army teams due to the Gulf War.

Honours

National
Iraq FA Cup
Runners-up (1): 1948–49

Regional
Iraq Central FA League
Winners (1): 1948–49
Runners-up (1): 1961–62
Iraq Central FA Perseverance Cup
Runners-up (1): 1962

References

Football clubs in Baghdad
Sport in Baghdad
History of Baghdad